Green Bay Metro (originally known as Green Bay Transit prior to 2001) is the mass transit system found in the city of Green Bay, Wisconsin. It also provides service in Ashwaubenon, Allouez, De Pere, and Bellevue.

History 
From 1916 through 1972, the Wisconsin Public Service Corporation (WPS), a privately owned utility company, provided streetcar and bus service in the Green Bay Metropolitan Area. In the late 1960s, bus ridership decreases combined with rising expenses forced WPS to reduce deficits by cutting back on service. Service cutbacks, in turn, contributed to further decreases in ridership and even greater revenue losses, resulting in a downward spiral of service, ridership, and revenue. In April 1972, WPS offered to sell the bus company to the city of Green Bay with an agreement to reimburse the city for the full purchase price of $270,000 in the form of an operating subsidy over a five-year period. In January 1973, WPS was granted the right to discontinue bus service in the Green Bay Metropolitan Area, at which time the city of Green Bay leased the bus system from WPS through the remainder of 1973. This action avoided a discontinuance of service and allowed time for the city to create the Transit Commission, consider alternative plans for the system developed by the Brown County Planning Commission (BCPC), and prepare for a public referendum on the purchase of the system. On 3 April 1973, 71 percent of the public voted in favor on a referendum calling for the purchase of the system from WPS.

Operations 
The bus transit system service method used in the Green Bay area is called a "radial pulse" system. The system is called "radial" because the layout of the routes brings all buses to the downtown transitway and then radiates them out in a spoke-like fashion to cover the service area. It is called a "pulse" system because all routes are timed to arrive at the downtown transitway at regular intervals, allowing for transfers with little or no waiting. This type of system has been in operation since 1937.

Most fixed-service routes either begin/end their route or "transfer", or stop for a period of typically 2-5 minutes, at the Transportation Center located at 901 University Avenue. Certain routes will provide service to microtransit transfer points, offering transfer opportunities to microtransit destinations.

On a five-year average the city of Green Bay has a total estimated budget for transportation of $7,770,111 with the city itself contributing $1,395,894.  The remainder of the budget comes from federal and state funding as well as other revenue.  The 2014 Green Bay Final Budget shows the Bus Operations having $6,255,258 in expenses and $1,079,500 in revenue.  This adds up to a $5,175,758 deficit for 2014.

Bus routes

Regular Service 
Fixed routes and "daytime" microtransit service is provided 5:45am-8:45pm weekdays, and 7:45am–3:45pm Saturdays. The system provides no regular service on Sundays, New Year's Day, Memorial Day, July Fourth, Labor Day, Thanksgiving and Christmas. Exceptions to lack of regular service occur with Game Day Service. Most routes provide 30-minute service on weekdays and Saturdays.

"GBM On Demand" Microtransit Service 
Microtransit is a demand-responsive transport vehicle service offering flexible routing and scheduling of minibus vehicles shared with other passengers. Green Bay Metro partners with Via to provide microtransit service utilizing smartphone applications and a similar fare structure. Riders can travel within zones, between zones, and between a zone and its corresponding transfer point. 

Service to Zones 1-4, otherwise referred to as "daytime service", operates during weekday and weekend fixed route scheduling. "Night time service", which includes Zones 1-5, is offered from 8:45pm-10:45pm Monday-Friday.  Zone 1 (red) services Green Bay's west side, including destinations such as Northeast Wisconsin Technical College. Zone 2 (gold) services Ashwaubenon, including destinations such as Austin Straubel International Airport and the Ashwaubenon Business Park. Zone 3 (light blue) services southern Ashwaubenon, southern Allouez and De Pere, including destinations such as Walmart De Pere, Syble Hopp School, Downtown De Pere, St. Norbert College, and the CP Center. Zone 4 (violet) services Bellevue and eastern Green Bay, including destinations such as the I-43 Business Center, Target East, Costco, Landmark Drive, OSMS, Bellevue Senior Living, and Aurora BayCare Medical Center.

Packers Gameday Routes 
Packers Game Day Routes are bus routes that only operate on the day of a Green Bay Packers football game being played at home. These routes are known as Cheesehead, QB Sneak, Lambeau Leap, and Quick Slant.  For more information, visit https://greenbaywi.gov/272/Game-Day-Routes

Limited Service 
Limited service routes #71, #75, and #78 operate on regularly scheduled school days and is open to the general public.

Bus Fleet 

As of March 2017, the Green Bay Metro bus system has 35 buses in use. The system uses 25 buses during peak hours.

The average age of the system's buses is 8.7 years, with the oldest 9 buses being 14 years old. Green Bay Metro has been planning on replacing older buses, but sufficient funding hasn't been able to have been established to replace all older buses at once. The system anticipates needing to order between 9 and 12 new buses by the year 2021.

Green Bay Transportation Center 

On 26 February 2001, all Metro operations relocated from the 318 South Washington Street facility to a new Transportation Center located at 901 University Avenue. The Washington Street facility was originally constructed in the late 1800s for administration, maintenance, and storage of an electric streetcar system. Both Wisconsin Public Service and the city of Green Bay financed many building expansions and enhancements over the years. However, the age of the structure, size of the bus fleet, and inefficiencies associated with the building were a problem for some time. This, along with the city of Green Bay's desire to make the waterfront property available for redevelopment, necessitated the move.

The Transportation Center has allowed all Metro employees to be located in one facility. Operational efficiencies of a modern facility and the reduction of "deadhead" mileage from the garage to the primary hub have been cost-saving benefits. The bus area needed to accommodate the indoor storage of 48-plus buses, six maintenance bays, bus wash and lifts, and the safe and efficient flow of the buses and people between all these elements. The site was an abandoned seven-acre parcel within a transitional neighborhood of industrial and older residential properties. The bus storage and maintenance areas total 85,000 square feet of the 98,500 square foot facility. This large expanse of building serves as the backdrop for the public and employee areas.

Passengers at the Transportation Center benefit from a staffed information counter, real-time bus arrival board, automated pass dispenser, spacious climate-controlled seated waiting area, vending machines, and public restrooms. Outside, a large canopy covering many bus stalls protects passengers from falling rain and snow. In addition, each bus route has a designated stall, and the distance passengers have to walk between buses is minimal. Special public hearings and informational meetings are also held at the Transportation Center. At the heart of the facility stands a 300-foot long canopy with 14-foot vertical clearance for bus traffic and a width sufficient for protecting the passengers from sun and rain. The concrete island has a smooth saw-tooth form for buses to enter and exit without backing up. The access to this platform is centralized at one crosswalk, which minimizes all cross traffic between passengers and buses.

Prior to 2011, Metro used a single hub located at the Transportation Center. Since then, the bus system is designed around one main hub at the Transportation Center and four peripheral hubs. All routes begin and end at the Transportation Center. In addition, intercity buses from Milwaukee, Madison, Minneapolis and Hancock, MI serve the facility. In July 2015, Greyhound Bus service was added to the Green Bay Metro Transit terminal after Greyhound Lines moved from their old bus station located across from Whitney Park at 800 Cedar St.

Ridership

See also 
 GO Transit (Wisconsin) Bus service serving Oshkosh, Wisconsin
 Valley Transit (Wisconsin) Bus service serving the Appleton, Wisconsin/Fox Cities Area
 List of intercity bus stops in Wisconsin
 List of bus transit systems in the United States

References

External links 
 Green Bay Metro
 Brown County Transit Planning Reports/Studys

Bus transportation in Wisconsin
Transportation in Green Bay, Wisconsin